"Durosoke" (Yoruba: "Stay Up") is a song by Nigerian hip hop recording artist Olamide. It was released as the lead single from his third studio album, Baddest Guy Ever Liveth (2013). The song was produced by Pheelz and written by Olamide. It is a mid tempo Yoruba song.

Music video
The accompanying music video for "Durosoke" was shot and directed in Nigeria by Clarence Peters. It was exclusively released on Star Music, a music platform established in February 2013 by Star Lager, one of Nigeria's largest brewing companies. In an interview, Olamide spoke on the release of "Durosoke", saying, "I don't remember the last time I was this excited about dropping something so fresh". The rapper's camp didn't reveal any details about the video and left fans speculating about its concept.

Durosoke's music video parody
Dean (also known as Olubaddo) performed a parody of "Durosoke" prior to the 2013 Cokobar Music Festival, headlined by Olamide alongside Flavour N'abania, and Sean Tizzle.

Critical reception
Upon its release, the song was met with positive reviews. Onos O of BellaNaija commented on the single, saying: "On "Durosoke", he takes a hint from Davido as he drops some gibberish in the hook. And for those who don't understand Yoruba, everything sounds like gibberish anyway but Olamide always comes through with the swag."

A writer for OyaMagazine gave the song 7 out of 10 stars, adding that "Durosoke, despite being sung largely in Yoruba Language is popular even among those who don't understand a word in the language. Olamide's originality stood out in this song, he shows us that he needs not struggle with lyrics as he does his thing in his mother's tongue. The beat isn't the fast-tempo one common in Nigerian dance tracks of today."

A writer for Pulse said that "the video is a departure from the usual party/club scene type video which would have been the norm for such a hit track. Clarence instead chooses to tell a story of sorts, albeit a quirky one. Just like the track, we foresee this video remaining on the charts for several weeks to come."

Accolades
"Durosoke" was nominated for Song of the Year and Best Rap Single at the 2013 edition of The Headies. The music video for "Durosoke" won Best Afro Hip Hop Video and was nominated for Video of the Year at the 2013 Nigeria Music Video Awards.

Track listing, covers, and remixes
"Durosoke" was remixed by Wakizy and Ayomide, two up and coming artists from Nigeria.

References

2013 songs
2013 singles
Olamide songs
Yoruba-language songs
YBNL Nation singles
Song recordings produced by Pheelz